Anton Leonardovych Idzkovsky was a Soviet football player, goalkeeper, and later an administrator for the Football Federation of the Ukrainian SSR. He is honored as the Distinguished Master of Sports (1945) and the Distinguished Coach of Ukraine (1961).

Anton Idzkovsky was an ethnic Pole and Roman Catholic. In interview to Ukrayinskyi Futbol newspaper answering questions about rumors of the Idzkovsky's cooperation with NKVD, the former secretary of Football Federation of the Ukrainian SSR Klavdia Kirianova explained that he was cautious and never talked about his origin.

References

External links
 Profile at rusteam.ru

1907 births
1995 deaths
Footballers from Kyiv
People from Kievsky Uyezd
People from the Russian Empire of Polish descent
Soviet people of Polish descent
Ukrainian people of Polish descent
Ukrainian Roman Catholics
Association football goalkeepers
Soviet footballers
Soviet Top League players
FC Dynamo Kyiv players
FC Dynamo Kazan players
Soviet football managers
Ukraine national football team managers
Merited Coaches of Ukraine
Honoured Masters of Sport of the USSR
Football Federation of Ukraine chairmen
Catholics in Ukraine